George Augustus Forneret (b Berthierville 23 September 1851 - Hamilton, Ontario 28 Aug 1925) was a Canadian Anglican priest.

Rigby was  educated at McGill University and ordained in 1876. After a curacy at Montreal Cathedral he was an SPG missionary on the Prince Albert Peninsula. He held incumbencies at Dunham, Dundas and  Hamilton. He was  Archdeacon of Wellington, ON from 1907 to 1911; and Archdeacon of Niagara from 1911 until his death.

References

Archdeacons of Niagara
Archdeacons of Wellington, ON
McGill University alumni
19th-century Canadian Anglican priests
20th-century Canadian Anglican priests
1851 births
1925 deaths
People from Lanaudière